Astro Storm is an enclosed, sit down roller coaster at Brean Leisure Park in Brean, England, created by German amusement ride manufacturer Zierer. It was formerly located at Pleasure Beach Blackpool in Blackpool, England where it was known as Space Invader 2.

History 
Space Invader opened on 21 August 1984, and was Blackpool Pleasure Beach's fourth steel roller coaster. The ride itself was constructed by Zierer, a German ride manufacturer. The original ride was similar to the ride as it is today. In 2000, a young boy died after reportedly unbuckling his safety belt after panicking. It was refurbished in 2003 by KumbaK Coasters and reopened in 2004 as "Space Invader 2". In September 2008, the ride closed following a failed evacuation during operating hours. They closed the ride due to the high cost needed to reopen. The ride was removed in June 2010 and sold to Brean Leisure Park.

Sale to Brean Leisure Park
It was announced in July 2010 that Blackpool Pleasure Beach had sold Space Invader to Brean Leisure Park. The ride had been standing, but not in operation for over 18 months. Since then, the ride has been refurbished, and renamed 'Astro Storm' prior to its opening in 2011.

The ride 
After leaving the station, cars make a 90° turn to the right and are carried to the top of a chain-lift hill; the cars then descend a 59ft drop in the dark, at an incline angle of 36°. The ride then has several drops, banked turns and helixes, before cars reach the brake run and return to the station to be unloaded.

Astro Storm operates single car trains. Riders are arranged in three rows for a total of three riders per car with a T-bar restraint. Before 2003 (when it was the Space Invader at Blackpool), the ride used cars which were able to carry 4 people and riders were restrained by a seatbelt.

Theming 

When it was Space Invader 2, the ride was themed around a journey through space, and was decorated with glow-in-the-dark pictures of stars, planets and aliens. The queue and loading area were themed around a space station, with various signs telling riders how long it would be until boarding their ride vehicles. Some parts of the queue were themed around the Star Wars films, such as a statue of Han Solo stuck in carbonite.

Astro Storm however has a different approach with regard to theming. The queue area (which is now outside) is themed and has a queue line video. This video tells you that "Astro Tours" are going to take you on a journey through space. Once the train starts you go through a set of doors to be confronted by a screen with a man on it telling you to "Abort!" because it has gone wrong.  The shouting continues as you go up the chain lift, with it becoming more chaotic as you reach the top with strobe lights and sirens. The rest of the ride is in pitch black, although there are lighting effects on the trim brakes and the odd piece of theming dotted around the ride.  There are also audio effects.

Incidents 
On 21 July 2000, 11-year-old Christopher Sheratt died after he fell out of the ride vehicle. Authorities ruled his death as 'accidental' since he panicked and unbuckled his seatbelt before being hit by another cart.

References 

Blackpool Pleasure Beach
Roller coasters introduced in 1984
Roller coasters in the United Kingdom
Amusement rides that closed in 2008